Nale Boniface (born 1993) is a Tanzanian beauty pageant titleholder who was crowned Miss Earth Tanzania 2014. She represented her country at the Miss Earth 2014 and replaced winner Carolyne Bernard to compete at the Miss Universe 2014 in Doral, Florida.

Education

Boniface was a student of medical science at Muhimbili University of Health and Allied Sciences and volunteered as an empowerment activist in Tanzania.

Miss Universe Tanzania 2014
On October 31, 2014 Boniface placed 1st Runner-up at Miss Universe Tanzania 2014 and was automatically awarded Miss Earth Tanzania 2014.

Miss Earth 2014

Boniface represented Tanzania at Miss Earth 2014 in Quezon City, Philippines on November 28, 2014.

Miss Universe 2014

On December 24, 2014 the grand winner of Miss Universe Carolyne Bernard withdrew from the Miss Universe 2014 pageant after an accident fractured her feet, preventing her from wearing high heels. Nale competed at Miss Universe 2014 final event.

References

External links
Official Miss Tanzania website

Living people
Miss Universe 2014 contestants
Miss Earth 2014 contestants
Tanzanian female models
Tanzanian beauty pageant winners
People from Dodoma
1993 births